The Gambia competed at the 2020 Summer Olympics in Tokyo. Originally scheduled to take place from 24 July to 9 August 2020, the Games were postponed to 23 July to 8 August 2021, due to the COVID-19 pandemic. It was the nation's tenth consecutive appearance at the Summer Olympics since its debut at the 1984 Summer Olympics.

Competitors

The following is the list of number of competitors in the Games.

Athletics

Gambian athletes achieved the entry standards, either by qualifying time or by world ranking, in the following track and field events (up to a maximum of 3 athletes in each event):

Track & road events

Judo
 
The Gambia qualified one judoka for the men's lightweight category (73 kg) at the Games. Rio 2016 Olympian Faye Njie accepted a continental berth from Africa as the nation's top-ranked judoka outside of direct qualifying position in the IJF World Ranking List of June 28, 2021.

Swimming

The Gambia received a universality invitation from FINA to send a top-ranked male swimmer in his respective individual events to the Olympics, based on the FINA Points System of June 28, 2021.

References

Nations at the 2020 Summer Olympics
2020
2021 in Gambian sport